All Seasons Place is a mixed-use skyscraper complex in Bangkok, Thailand. It comprises the -tall China Resources Tower (also known as the China Resources Center or CRC Tower) and four smaller buildings that surround it: two office towers (M Thai Tower and Capitol Tower), a residential condominium (All Seasons Mansion) and the Conrad Bangkok hotel.

The complex, a prominent landmark on Witthayu Road in Bangkok's Pathum Wan District, is operated by All Seasons Development, a joint-venture established in 1989 between Hong Kong-based China Resources and Thai real estate developer M Thai Group. CRC Tower was the fifth-tallest building in Thailand at its completion in 2002.

Tenants
Tenants at All Seasons Place include:
Embassy of Italy
Embassy of New Zealand
Embassy of South Africa
Embassy of Ukraine
Embassy of United of Arab Emirates
Microsoft (Thailand)
Bank of America
CBRE

See also
List of tallest buildings in Thailand

References

Skyscrapers in Bangkok
Pathum Wan district
Skyscraper office buildings in Thailand